Governor Page may refer to:

Carroll S. Page (1843–1925), 43rd Governor of Vermont
John Page (New Hampshire politician) (1787–1865), 17th Governor of New Hampshire
John Page (Virginia politician) (1743–1808), 13th Governor of Virginia
John B. Page (1826–1885), 30th Governor of Vermont